Unión Deportiva Puçol is a Spanish football team based in Puçol, in the autonomous community of Valencia. Founded in 1951 it plays in Regional Preferente – Group 1, holding home games at Estadio José Claramunt, which has a capacity of 2,000 spectators.

Season to season

11 seasons in Tercera División

Notable former players
 Jorge Giménez
 Francisco Sandaza
 Jorge Morcillo

Notable former coaches
 Luis Milla

External links
Official website 
Futbolme.com profile 

Football clubs in the Valencian Community
Association football clubs established in 1951
Divisiones Regionales de Fútbol clubs
1951 establishments in Spain